Oskar Petrus Nissinen (26 July 1864, Sortavala – 27 March 1937) was a Finnish land surveyor, farmer and politician.
He was a Member of the Diet of Finland from 1900 to 1906 and a Member of the Parliament of Finland from 1917 to 1919, representing the Young Finnish Party until 1918 and the National Coalition Party from 1918 to 1919.

References

1864 births
1937 deaths
People from Sortavala
People from Viipuri Province (Grand Duchy of Finland)
Young Finnish Party politicians
National Coalition Party politicians
Members of the Diet of Finland
Members of the Parliament of Finland (1917–19)
People of the Finnish Civil War (White side)
University of Helsinki alumni